Tim Stowers (born February 8, 1958) is an American football coach and former player. He served as the head football coach at the Georgia Southern University from 1990 to 1995 and the University of Rhode Island from 2000 to 2007, compiling a career college football coaching record of 84–80. His 1990 Georgia Southern Eagles football team won the NCAA Division I-AA Football Championship. Stowers was the head football coach at Southwest Mississippi Community College from 2018 to 2020.

Head coaching record

College

References

1958 births
Living people
American football linebackers
American football defensive linemen
American football offensive linemen
Auburn Tigers baseball players 
Auburn Tigers football players
Auburn Tigers football coaches
Central Connecticut Blue Devils football coaches
Georgia Southern Eagles football coaches
Jacksonville State Gamecocks football coaches
Junior college football coaches in the United States
Rhode Island Rams football coaches
Temple Owls football coaches
People from Union Springs, Alabama
People from Bullock County, Alabama
People from Commerce, Georgia
Coaches of American football from Alabama
Players of American football from Alabama
Baseball players from Alabama